Prince Nikolai Grigoryevich Repnin-Volkonsky (Russian: Николай Григорьевич Репнин-Волконский; 1778 – 6/18 January 1845) was a general in the Imperial Russian Army.

Life

He was the son of general prince Grigorij Semënovič Volkonsky, but the adoptive son of his maternal grandfather Nicholas Repnin. He joined the Russian Guards before taking up a colonelcy in the Chevalier Guards during the campaign against the French. He was captured at the battle of Austerlitz and only freed after the Peace of Tilsit. He was promoted to major general and was made ambassador to the Kingdom of Westphalia in 1809 and Spain in 1810. In 1809 he was elected an honorary member of the Göttingen Academy of Sciences.

He returned to Russia in 1811 and a year later was put in command of a cavalry regiment in the army department commanded by Peter Wittgenstein. In October 1813, after the battle of Leipzig, he became Governor-General (Viceroy) in Saxony, until being replaced by the Prussian General Government in November 1814. During this period he worked to stabilise and rebuilt Saxony and attempted to turn its capital Dresden into the centre of German art, commissioning the external staircase to Brühl's Terrace and opening the Großer Garten to the public. He also put up a monument on the Räcknitzhöhe near Dresden to the wounding of Jean-Victor Moreau.

He took part in the Hundred Days campaign and the Council of Vienna. In 1816 he became governor of the Province of Poltava and in 1835 a member of the State Council.

References

Military personnel of the Russian Empire
Russian generals
1778 births
1845 deaths
Russian diplomats